Cher's Golden Greats is the first compilation album by American singer-actress Cher, released on 1968 by Imperial Records and Liberty Records. The album peaked at 195 on the US Billboard 200 chart and was released as part of the contract with the Imperial Records and Liberty Records.

Track listing

Personnel
 Cher - lead vocals

Production
 Sonny Bono - record producer

Charts

References

External links 
 Official Cher site
 Imperial Records Official Site

1968 greatest hits albums
Cher compilation albums
Liberty Records compilation albums
Imperial Records compilation albums
Albums produced by Sonny Bono